The 2013–14 Wisconsin Badgers women's basketball team will represent University of Wisconsin at Madison during the 2013–14 NCAA Division I women's basketball season. The Badgers, led by 3rd year head coach Bobbie Kelsey, play their home games at the Kohl Center and were members of the Big Ten Conference. They finish with a record of 10–19 overall, 3–13 in Big Ten play for an eleventh-place finish.

Roster

Schedule

|-
!colspan=9 style="background:#cc1122; color:#ffffff;"| Exhibition

|-
!colspan=9 style="background:#cc1122; color:#ffffff;"| Non-conference regular season

|-
!colspan=9 style="background:#cc1122; color:#ffffff;"| Big Ten regular season

|-
!colspan=9 style="background:#cc1122; color:#ffffff;"| Big Ten Women's Tournament

Source

See also
2013–14 Wisconsin Badgers men's basketball team

References

Wisconsin Badgers women's basketball seasons
Wisconsin
Wisconsin Badgers women's basketball
Wisconsin Badgers women's basketball